Sparta Township is one of twenty-one townships in Knox County, Illinois, USA.  As of the 2010 census, its population was 1,165 and it contained 517 housing units.

Geography

Cities, towns, villages
 Wataga

Cemeteries
The township contains these two cemeteries: Robbins and Wataga.

Demographics

School districts
 Galesburg Community Unit School District 205
 Rowva Community Unit School District 208

Political districts
 Illinois's 17th congressional district
 State House District 74
 State Senate District 37

References
Notes
 
 United States Census Bureau 2009 TIGER/Line Shapefiles
 United States National Atlas
Sources

External links
 City-Data.com
 Illinois State Archives
 Township Officials of Illinois

Townships in Knox County, Illinois
Galesburg, Illinois micropolitan area
Townships in Illinois